Gooniyandi is an Australian Aboriginal language now spoken by about 100 people, most of whom live in or near Fitzroy Crossing in Western Australia. Gooniyandi is an endangered language as it is not being passed on to children, who instead grow up speaking Kriol.

Classification
Gooniyandi is closely related to Bunuba, to about the same degree as English is related to Dutch. The two are the only members of the Bunuban language family. Unlike the majority of Australian Aboriginal languages, Gooniyandi and Bunuba are non-Pama–Nyungan.

Phonology 
Gooniyandi has three vowel sounds: /a, i, u/. /a/ has contrastive vowel length.

Orthography
A Gooniyandi alphabet based on the Latin script was adopted by the community in 1984, and subsequently revised in 1990 and again in 1999. It is not phonemic, as it omits some distinctions made in speech.

Grammar

Gooniyandi has no genders, but a large number of cases; it uses an ergative-absolutive case system. It is a verb-final language, but without a dominant order between the subject and the object.

Notes

References

External links
Gooniyandi on the Omniglot website
Rosetta Project: Gooniyandi Swadesh List
Gooniyandi Aboriginal Corporation 

Bunuban languages
Kimberley (Western Australia)
Endangered indigenous Australian languages in Western Australia